Sargent Claude Johnson (November 7, 1888 – October 10, 1967) was one of the first African-American artists working in California to achieve a national reputation. He was known for Abstract Figurative and Early Modern styles. He was a painter, potter, ceramicist, printmaker, graphic artist, sculptor, and carver. He worked with a variety of media, including ceramics, clay, oil, stone, terra-cotta, watercolor, and wood.

Early life
Sargent Johnson was the third of six children, born to a father of Swedish descent and his mother of African-American and Cherokee ancestry. His father died in 1897, and his mother died of tuberculosis only five years after, in 1902. Sargent, at fifteen, along with his siblings, went to live with their uncle, Sherman Jackson Williams, and his wife, May Howard Jackson, in Washington. May was a pioneer African American sculptor specializing in portrait busts with Negro themes, and she undoubtedly influenced Sargent Johnson at an early age. Later,  the boys of the family were sent to an orphanage in Worcester, Massachusetts, and the girls to a Catholic school for African American and Native-American girls in Pennsylvania. As adults, some of Sargent's siblings did not identify as African American, choosing to live as either Native Americans or Caucasians, though Sargent identified as African American.

Johnson's transition from a practicing artist to a professional is undocumented mainly, though some say he left Boston for Chicago to live with some relatives. In 1915, Sargent Johnson moved to the San Francisco Bay area. The Panama–Pacific International Exposition, which had a stimulating influence on California art, took place shortly after his move. The same year, Sargent Johnson married Pearl Lawson and began studying drawing and painting at the A. W. Best School of Art. He attended the California School of Fine Arts (now the San Francisco Art Institute) from 1919 to 1923, where his teachers included the sculptors Beniamino Bufano and Ralph Stackpole.

Consuelo Kanaga, a photographer of that time, knew him well and said of Johnson, "He was beautiful in his spirit, the way he talked, the way he thought, the way he worked, the way he felt. I don't mean he didn't have problems. He did—terrible problems—but he was still beautiful. It was his spirit, the way he looked at everything."

Career

Sargent Johnson began showing his work with the Harmon Foundation of New York in 1926. Through the foundation, known for supporting African-American art, he exhibited many of his pieces and became locally and nationally known. There was a total of 87 pieces displayed at the show, and a $150 prize for most outstanding work went to Johnson, "showing a porcelain head of a Negro child, Pearl, and two drawings, one of which, Defiant, is massively constructed and as simple in its planes as is so much of the modern Mexican work." He was usually not included in "American art" because how his pieces ignored traditional western techniques and were inspired by foreign cultures, such as Mexican muralists Diego Rivera, José Clemente Orozco, David Alfaro Siqueiros and others.

In 1928, Johnson's award-winning artwork garnered him fame amongst artists in the Harlem Renaissance movement.

In the late 1930s, Sargent Johnson commissioned his work with the Federal Arts Project (FAP).  As a member of the bohemian San Francisco Bay community and influenced by the New Negro Movement, Sargent Johnson's early work focused on racial identity.

Sargent Johnson's work is notable for its clean simplicity, directness, and strength of conception and execution. He focused most of his work on his depictions of African Americans, especially in redefining the image of the African American woman.

Johnson said, "It is the pure American Negro I am concerned with, aiming to show the natural beauty and dignity in that characteristic lip and that characteristic hair, bearing, and manner; and I wish to show that beauty not so much to the white man as to the Negro himself. Unless I can interest my race, I am sunk." Also, "Negroes are a colorful race; they call for an art as colorful as they can be made."

Beginning in the 1940s, Johnson's work became less focused on racial themes and more abstract in its design even though this change in style, the importance of racial identity can still be seen in his figures.

Johnson never made enough to support himself through his art, so he worked many odd jobs during the day while focusing on his craft during the evenings and weekends. He continued participating in local exhibitions and accepted private commissions to supplement his income.

Beginning in 1945 and continuing through 1965, Sargent Johnson made many trips to Oaxaca and Southern Mexico and started incorporating the people and culture, particularly archeology, into his work. Other subjects included African American figures, animals, and Native Americans. During this time, Johnson also began experimenting with different types of mediums, such as ceramics and paint.

Personal life 
In 1936, Johnson and his wife separated.  His only daughter, Pearl, was sent to live with her mother.  But, in 1947, Johnson's former wife was hospitalized.  In 1964, she died at Stockton State Hospital.  Following her death, Johnson remained on good terms with her and visited her regularly. His wife and family profoundly impacted his artwork, as most of his pieces centered around those he loved.  Johnson died from a heart attack at his home in California on October 10, 1967.  He had suffered from severe angina pectoris for nearly two decades.

Auction Records
On February 23, 2010, Swann Galleries auctioned Sargent Claude Johnson's Untitled (Standing Woman), a painted terra cotta sculpture, c. 1933-35, for $52,800 - an auction record at the time for the artist. In 2009 the University of California, Berkeley unwittingly sold a work by Johnson for $164.63, later valued at more than a million dollars. The 22-foot carved redwood relief panel was eventually purchased by the Huntington Library. It will be displayed in its new American wing.

Notes

External links

 Sargent Johnson in Voices and Images of California Art

1888 births
1967 deaths
San Francisco Art Institute alumni
American potters
American ceramists
American graphic designers
Federal Art Project artists
20th-century American painters
American male painters
20th-century American sculptors
20th-century American male artists
American male sculptors
20th-century American printmakers
20th-century ceramists
African-American sculptors
African-American printmakers
20th-century African-American painters